The Gausson  is a soliton which is the solution of the logarithmic Schrödinger equation, which describes a quantum particle in a possible nonlinear quantum mechanics. The logarithmic Schrödinger equation preserves
the dimensional homogeneity of the equation, i.e. the product of the independent solutions in one dimension remain the solution in multiple dimensions.
While the nonlinearity alone cannot cause the quantum entanglement between dimensions, the logarithmic Schrödinger equation can be solved by the separation of variables.

Let the nonlinear Logarithmic Schrödinger equation in one dimension will be given by  :

Let assume the  Galilean invariance i.e.

Substituting

The first equation can be written as

Substituting additionally

and assuming

we get the normal Schrödinger equation for  the quantum harmonic oscillator:

The solution is therefore the normal ground state of the harmonic oscillator if only 

or

The full solitonic solution is therefore given by

where

This solution describes the soliton moving with the constant velocity  and not changing
the shape (modulus) of the Gaussian function.  When a potential is added, not only can a single Gausson provide an exact solution to a number of cases of the Logarithmic Schrödinger equation, it has been found that a linear combination of Gaussons can very accurately approximate excited states as well.
This superposition property of Gaussons has been demonstrated for quadratic
potentials.

References

Quantum mechanics